Matthew David Fisher (born 9 November 1997) is an English cricketer, contracted to play for Yorkshire County Cricket Club. He made his international debut for the England cricket team in March 2022.

Career

Domestic career
Fisher made his debut on 9 June 2013 in the 2013 Yorkshire Bank 40 against Leicestershire, and at the age of 15 years and 212 days, became the youngest cricketer to play in a competitive county game. The previous record was set in 1922 by the Welsh cricketer Royston Gabe-Jones. In May 2015 on his debut in the T20 Blast, he took five wickets for Yorkshire against Derbyshire.

Since debut Fisher has suffered a range of injuries including side strains, a broken thumb, a dislocated shoulder, a back stress injury and recurrent hamstring problems, all of which have limited his involvement in county cricket over a number of seasons.

In April 2022, Fisher was bought by the Birmingham Phoenix for the 2022 season of The Hundred.

International career
Fisher was included in the England Under 19 squad in 2013 aged 15, he has also featured for the England Lions team playing against the Australia A team in December 2021.

In February 2022, Fisher was named in England's Test squad for their series against the West Indies. He made his Test debut on 16 March 2022, for England against the West Indies.

References

External links
 

1997 births
Living people
English cricketers
England Test cricketers
Yorkshire cricketers
Cricketers from York
North v South cricketers
Marylebone Cricket Club cricketers
English cricketers of the 21st century
Northern Superchargers cricketers